Moses Daddy-Ajala Simon (born 12 July 1995) is a Nigerian professional footballer who plays as a forward for Ligue 1 club Nantes and the Nigeria national team.

Club career

Early career
Born in Jos,his father served in the Nigeria Army before his retirement.Simon is a product of the famed GBS Academy, the same football academy in Nigeria that produced the likes of Ahmed Musa. He was linked with Nigerian Premier League club Kaduna United, as many professional clubs around the world were also eager to sign him. On 10 May 2013, it was announced that Simon had signed a pre-contractual agreement with Dutch club Ajax to join them in pre-season training, having previously been linked with Liverpool and Tottenham Hotspur. He made his first appearance for Ajax on 13 July 2013 in pre-season friendly match against De Graafschap, coming on as a substitute player and scoring the third and final goal in the 64th minute of the match, in a 3–0 away win. He made a further appearance on 17 July, playing for the reserves team Jong Ajax in a pre-season friendly match against Voorschoten '97, scoring the second goal in the 5–0 home win. On 25 July 2013, it was announced that Ajax would not sign the young Nigerian, ultimately waiving him from the pre-season roster. After the announcement discussions commenced with AS Trenčín; Ajax partner club in Slovakia, which is owned by former Ajax player Tschen La Ling.

AS Trenčín
On 13 January 2014, Simon signed three-year contract for Slovak side Trenčín. He would join his compatriot Kingsley Madu. He made his league debut in a 1–1 draw against MFK Košice starting on the right wing alongside Gino van Kessel who was on loan from Ajax. He made his club international debut during the Trenčín's 2014–15 UEFA Europa League campaign, when he was introduced during the second preliminary round of the competition, in the home match against Vojvodina Novi Sad from Serbia (played at the stadium in Dubnica, Slovakia). Simon scored a hat trick on his debut in the 4–0 win at home. AS Trenčín would eventually get eliminated in the following round, drawing at home, and falling 2–1 away against Hull City.

In October 2014 ESPN sports prepared a scouting report on Moses Simon and the report linked the winger with a move to Liverpool, Tottenham Hotspur, Hull City along with a potential return to Ajax. The situation evolved into a bidding war between Dutch club Heerenveen and Gent, with the later contractually securing the winger for three years.

Gent

On 6 January 2015, it was announced that Gent had signed Moses Simon to a three-year contract. He made his debut for Gent on 17 January 2015 in a 3–1 win against Royal Mouscron-Péruwelz in league play. His second appearance occurred four days later in a 1–0 home win against Lokeren in the Belgian Cup, in which Simon was sent off 30 seconds after he entered the field. In his third league game, again versus Sporting Lokeren, Simon scored a hat trick after which he was named Belgian league player of the week. He quickly became a key player in coach Hein Vanhaezebrouck's formation and helped Gent win their first ever national Championship title in May 2015. Two months later, Simon assisted Laurent Depoitre's winning goal in the 2015 Belgian Super Cup against cup winners Club Brugge.

Levante
On 6 August 2018, Simon joined Spanish La Liga side Levante on a five-year contract. In March 2019 he said he was glad to be playing for the team.

Nantes
On 15 August 2019, Simon was loaned out to Ligue 1 club Nantes. At the end of the season, Nantes triggered the option to buy in Simon’s loan. He signed a four-year contract with the club.

International career
Simon received his first call-up to the Nigeria national team by coach Daniel Amokachi in March 2015 and made his debut on the 25th of the same month in an international friendly against Uganda, when he replaced Anthony Ujah after 59 minutes in the game. Simon scored his first goal for Nigeria in an international friendly against Niger on 8 September 2015, the second in a 2–0 win. He was selected by Nigeria for their 35-man provisional squad for the 2016 Summer Olympics.

In May 2018, he was named in Nigeria’s preliminary 30-man squad for the 2018 World Cup in Russia. However, he did not make the final 23 due to injury. He was included in the country's 23-man squad for the 2019 Africa Cup of Nations.

Career statistics

Club

International

Scores and results list Nigeria's goal tally first, score column indicates score after each Simon goal.

Honours
Gent
Belgian Pro League: 2014–15
Belgian Super Cup: 2015

Nantes
Coupe de France: 2021–22

References

External links

Moses Simon at Goal.com

1995 births
Living people
Sportspeople from Jos
Nigerian footballers
Nigeria international footballers
Nigeria under-20 international footballers
Nigerian expatriate footballers
Association football forwards
AFC Ajax players
Jong Ajax players
AS Trenčín players
K.A.A. Gent players
Levante UD footballers
FC Nantes players
Slovak Super Liga players
Belgian Pro League players
La Liga players
Ligue 1 players
Expatriate footballers in Slovakia
Expatriate footballers in Belgium
Expatriate footballers in Spain
Expatriate footballers in France
Nigerian expatriate sportspeople in Slovakia
Nigerian expatriate sportspeople in Belgium
Nigerian expatriate sportspeople in Spain
2019 Africa Cup of Nations players
2021 Africa Cup of Nations players